Eight ships of the Royal Navy have borne the name HMS Centaur, after the half-human, half-horse centaur of Greek mythology:

  was a 24-gun sixth rate launched in 1746 and sold in 1761.
  was a 74-gun third rate ship of the line, formerly the French ship Centaure.  She was captured at the Battle of Lagos in 1759, and foundered in a hurricane in 1782.
  was a 74-gun third rate launched in 1797, decommissioned in 1816, and broken up in 1819.
  was a wooden paddle frigate launched in 1845 and scrapped in 1864.
 HMS Centaur was to have been an  armoured cruiser, but she was renamed  in 1890, prior to her launch in 1891.
She was launched in 1916 and sold for scrap in 1934.
 HMS Centaur was to have been a  destroyer.

See also
  for non-Royal Navy ships of the name.

References
 

Royal Navy ship names